Dmitry Usagin (born January 31, 1978, in Chişinău) is a boxer from Bulgaria, who competed for his native country at the 2000 Summer Olympics in Sydney, Australia.

Usagin is best known for winning the bronze medal at 2000 European Amateur Boxing Championships in the Men's Light-Middleweight (– 71 kg) division, alongside Yugoslavia's Nikola Sjekloća. He failed to qualify for the 2004 Summer Olympics, finishing in third place at the 3rd AIBA European 2004 Olympic Qualifying Tournament in Gothenburg, Sweden.

References
 sports-reference

1978 births
Living people
Light-middleweight boxers
Boxers at the 2000 Summer Olympics
Olympic boxers of Bulgaria
Sportspeople from Chișinău
Bulgarian male boxers
Naturalised citizens of Bulgaria
20th-century Bulgarian people